Volutella may refer to:
 Volutella (fungus), a genus of funguses in the family Nectriaceae
 Volutella, a genus of gastropods in the family Volutidae; synonym of Zidona
 Volutella, a genus of protists